The Roman Catholic Archdiocese of Pretoria is a Latin Catholic archdiocese and the Metropolitan See for the ecclesiastical province of Pretoria in South Africa.

The cathedral archiepiscopal see of the Archbishop is Sacred Heart Cathedral in Pretoria.

History 
 Established on 1948.04.09 as Apostolic Vicariate of Pretoria, on territory split off from the Apostolic Vicariate of Kimberley in South Africa and the Apostolic Vicariate of Transvaal 
 Promoted on 1951.01.11 as Metropolitan Archdiocese of Pretoria, yet remains dependent on the Roman Congregation for the Evangelization of Peoples (like missionary jurisdictions).
 Lost territory on 1971.06.28 to establish the Apostolic Prefecture of Rustenburg (now its suffragan see)

Bishops

Episcopal ordinaries
Apostolic Vicar of Pretoria
 John Colburn Garner (9 April 1948 appointed – 1951.01.11), Titular Bishop of Tracula (1948.04.09 – 1951.01.11)

Metropolitan Archbishops of Pretoria
 John Colburn Garner (1951.01.11 - 28 April 1975 resigned), also first Military Vicar of South Africa (1951.05.17 – 1976.03.26)
 George Francis Daniel (28 April 1975 appointed - 24 November 2008 retired), also last Military Vicar of South Africa (South Africa) (1976.03.26 – 1986.07.21), restyled first Military Ordinary of South African Defence Force (1986.07.21 – 2008.11.24)
 Paul Mandla Khumalo, Congregation of the Missionaries of Mariannhill (C.M.M.) (24 November 2008 appointed - 15 December 2009 resigned), also Military Ordinary of South African Defence Force (2008.11.24 – 2009.12.15); previously Bishop of Witbank (South Africa) (2001.10.02 – 2008.11.24)
''Apostolic Administrator Msgr. Abel Gabuza (2009.12.15 – 2010.12.23), without other office; later Bishop of Kimberley (South Africa) (2010.12.23 – 2018.12.08)
 William Slattery, O.F.M. (23 December 2010 appointed - 30 April 2019); also Military Ordinary of South Africa; previously Bishop of Kokstad (South Africa) (1993.11.17 – 2010.12.23)
 Dabula Mpako (30 April 2019 appointed), simultaneously appointed Military Ordinary of South African Defence Force

Other priests of this diocese who became bishop
Abel Gabuza, appointed Bishop of Kimberley in 2010
Dabula Anthony Mpako, appointed Bishop of Queenstown in 2011; later returned here as Archbishop
Victor Hlolo Phalana, appointed Bishop of Klerksdorp in 2014

Province 
Its ecclesiastical province comprises the archbishopric and the following Suffragan sees:
 Roman Catholic Diocese of Francistown, Botswana
 Roman Catholic Diocese of Gaborone, Botswana
 Roman Catholic Diocese of Polokwane
 Roman Catholic Diocese of Rustenburg
 Roman Catholic Diocese of Tzaneen

See also
 Roman Catholicism in South Africa

References

External links 
 GCatholic.org with incumbent bio links

 
Roman Catholic dioceses in South Africa
Christian organizations established in 1948
Religious organisations based in South Africa
Roman Catholic ecclesiastical provinces in South Africa
Roman Catholic dioceses and prelatures established in the 20th century
1948 establishments in South Africa
A